Ghaniaki  is a village in Kapurthala district of Punjab State, India. The village is administrated by a Sarpanch, who is an elected representative.

Demography 
According to the report published by Census India in 2011, Ghaniaki has a total number of 102 houses and population of 517 of which include 277 males and 240 females. Literacy rate of Ghaniaki is 74.62%, lower than state average of 75.84%.  The population of children under the age of 6 years is 52 which is  10.06% of total population of Ghaniaki, and child sex ratio is approximately  857, higher than state average of 846.

Population data

Air travel connectivity 
The closest airport to the village is Sri Guru Ram Dass Jee International Airport.

Villages in Kapurthala

References

External links
  Villages in Kapurthala
 Kapurthala Villages List

Villages in Kapurthala district